Sinocyclocheilus hei is a species of cyprinid fish endemic to China.

References 

hei
Fish described in 2004